Bapuji Mudgal Deshpande (1608–1665) was a general who served Shivaji.

Early life 
The Deshpande family warriors didn't have firm direction before 1636 and were engaged in battles where they would sometimes ally with Adilshah or with Nizamshah. The Deshpande family had a light infantry of 500 people, consisting of local Mahadev Koli, Ramoshi and Marathas.

It was 1636 when the family met Jijabai, Konde Deshmukh and Dadoji Konddeo, and offered their own Wada for stay to the Bhonsales.

Bapuji Mugdal belonged to this family that came from a Chandraseniya Kayastha Prabhu i.e. CKP community of Maharashtra. The family's original name was Narhekar and obtained the name Deshpande because they were the Deshpandes of Khedebare.

Shivapur Village 
This family supported and encouraged idea of new village development of Khed Shivapur.

First recapturing of Kondhana in 1647 
By using force of his military, Bapuji removed Adilshahi, the Kiladar of Kondhana, and started Swarajya’s rule over there. Later, Muse Khan made complaint to Adilshaha about this incident. As a response, Sultan sent small army, headed by the Ghorpades (who used to hate Bhonsale family), but Bapuji Mudgal Deshpande, Dadoji Konddeo and 18-year-old Shivaji convinced Ghorpade about their action, Ghorpades believed to punish Dadoji Konddeo by cutting his one hand as he sided the Bhonsale’s wing in spite of servant of Adilshah.

Second recapturing of Kondhana in 1656 
After giving Kondhana fort to Adilshaha in 1650, Shivaji realized the need to have control of this strategically important fort near Pune. He ordered Bapuji to look on to this matter. Bapuji had unique idea to handle this issue without war, he convinced Muslim Kiladar of Kondhana by offering huge “Inam” tax free land near Khed Shivapur village in return of this fort’s control and thus avoided battle and blood lash. Shivaji got so impressed when he came to know the way by which Bapuji got this fort, he paid good reward to him and kept “Karkhanishi” of fort to Deshpande family.

Later life and inheritance 
His son Keso Narayan Deshpande fought in Purandar fort’s battle during 1670 and successfully recaptured this fort but was unfortunately killed in the battle in the hands of Mirad Khan who was Kiladar of Purandar. Later Shivaji Raje awarded Mujumdari (Administrative Post) of fort and area from Pune to Baramati  to Niliopant Mujumdar of Pune.

References

1608 births
1665 deaths
People of the Maratha Empire
Warriors of the Maratha Empire